The United States Marine Mammal Program is an organization developed by the United States National Committee and the International Marine Mammal Working Group of the International Biological Program in 1969, for the study of marine mammals.

References

1969 establishments in the United States
Marine biology
Marine mammals